Nadalama may refer to several places in Estonia:
Nadalama, Lääne-Viru County, village in Estonia
Nadalama, Rapla County, village in Estonia